Ben William David Llewellin (born 11 July 1994) is a Welsh sports shooter, who won a silver medal for Wales in the Men's skeet at the 2018 Commonwealth Games.

He was born in Haverfordwest, the son of rally driver David Llewellin. In 2016 he won a silver medal at the International Shooting Sport Federation World Cup Finals in Cyprus, followed in 2017 by another at New Delhi, where he and Riccardo Filippelli of Italy both fired a world record score. Later in the year he won a gold medal in the Skeet event at the Oceania and Commonwealth Shooting Federations' Championships in Australia.

He won silver at the 2018 Commonwealth Games, finishing second to former world champion Georgios Achilleos of Cyprus, with a score of 56 out of 60 targets.

References

External links

1994 births
Sportspeople from Haverfordwest
Skeet shooters
Commonwealth Games medallists in shooting
Commonwealth Games silver medallists for Wales
Living people
Shooters at the 2018 Commonwealth Games
European Games competitors for Great Britain
Shooters at the 2019 European Games
Medallists at the 2018 Commonwealth Games